Naseema Ehsan is a Pakistani politician who has been a member of Senate of Pakistan since March 2012.

Political career
She was elected to the Senate of Pakistan as candidate of Balochistan National Party Awami in 2012 Pakistani Senate election.

References

Living people
Pakistani senators (14th Parliament)
Year of birth missing (living people)